ADX-71149, also known as JNJ-40411813 and JNJ-mGluR2-PAM, is a selective positive allosteric modulator of the mGlu2 receptor. It is being studied by Addex Therapeutics and Janssen Pharmaceuticals for the treatment of schizophrenia. It was also researched by these companies for the treatment of anxious depression (major depressive disorder with anxiety symptoms), but although some efficacy was observed in clinical trials, it was not enough to warrant further development for this indication. , ADX-71149 is in phase II clinical trials for schizophrenia.

See also 
 Biphenylindanone A
 Eglumegad
 LY-404,039
 LY-379,268
 LY-487,379

References

External links 
 ADX71149 for Schizophrenia - Addex Therapeutics
 ADX71149 for Anxiety - Addex Therapeutics
 ADX 71149 - AdisInsight

4-Phenylpiperidines
Lactams
MGlu5 receptor antagonists
Chloroarenes
Pyridones
Experimental drugs